Tegstedt is a Swedish surname. Notable people with the surname include:

Filip Tegstedt (born 1978), Swedish film director
Frida Tegstedt (born 1987), Swedish handball player

Swedish-language surnames